Pyramid of fire is a drinking game among college/university students in Europe and America. Pyramid of fire is a combination of two other drinking games ring of fire and pyramid. The aim of this game is to give people the opportunity to drink fast and in large quantity whilst with a group of friends in a fun and exciting way.

Equipment
Beer/Other alcoholic drinks
A deck of playing cards
A large jug or glass

Set up
The players must make a pyramid of face down cards by stacking them into five rows with each row having the same number of cards according to its row number. (e.g. the bottom row having 5 cards and the top row having 1) Then the dealer must give each player 4 cards and leave the remainder of the stack face down near the jug/glass.

Game Play

Ring of fire

The first player turns over a card at the bottom left of the pyramid. At the beginning of the game each card will be assigned a rule. When the card is turned over the player who turned over the card has play the rule that it is associated with it in Ring of Fire. (a list of possible rules is below)For next player to flip a card will be the person sitting to the left of the last person to flip a card and once the rule for each card has been played you must also play the pyramid rule of that card too.

Pyramid

So a card has been turned over and the Ring of Fire rule has been played now each player looks at the 4 cards in their hand. If they have the card that has been turned over they may tell any other player on the table to consume a number of figures of their drinking according to the row on which the card has been turned over.(1st row = 1 figure, 2nd row = 2 fingers, 3rd row = 3 fingers, etc.) Now the player who has to drink has a choice, as they cannot see the other players cards they don't actually know if that player holds the card they are telling them to drink over so they can decide if they think the player is lying to challenge them. If a challenge is called and the player who told the challenger to drink has the card being played the challenger must drink double the number of fingers but if the player does not have the card being played the player must drink the fingers instead.

Possible Ring of Fire Rules

References

External links 
 "A list of possible rules for Ring of Fire."
 "A more in-depth set of Pyramid rules."
 "A site showing the adverse effects of drinking heavily."

Drinking games